Richard P. "Rick" Lang (born December 12, 1953) is a Canadian curler from Thunder Bay, Ontario. He is a two-time World champion and three-time Brier champion representing Northern Ontario. He currently serves as a performance consultant for Curling Canada.

Playing career
Lang was runner up at the 1971 Canadian Junior Curling Championships as the lead on Doug Smith's team. He later played third with Brier champions Bill Tetley (1975), and Al Hackner (1982, 1985), winning two World championships with Hackner and a bronze medal at the Worlds with Tetley. He also skipped Northern Ontario to a gold medal at the 1981 Canadian Mixed Curling Championship. Lang later skipped Northern Ontario at the 1991 and 1993 Briers. He also played third on Al Hackner's Canadian Senior Men's championship team in 2006, and won a silver medal on the team at the 2007 World Senior Curling Championships. He later became a Head Coach for the Northern Ontario curling team on both the men's and women's side, appearing in both the 2020 Brier and Scotties Tournament of Hearts.

Personal life
He is married to Lorraine Lang and has two children, Adam and Sarah. In February 2020, Lang survived a plane crash while returning home from the Scotties invitation with the team he had been coaching.

References

External links
 

1953 births
World curling champions
Living people
Brier champions
Canadian mixed curling champions
Canadian curling coaches
Curlers from Thunder Bay